Allen Lakeman (1849 – 7 May 1910) was a New Zealand-born Australian politician.

He was born in Taranaki to retired storekeeper William Lakeman and Martha Allen. He arrived in New South Wales around 1867, and eventually settled in Hay, where he was an alderman and mayor. On 3 March 1873 he married Ellen Cochran, with whom he had twelve children. In 1887 he was elected to the New South Wales Legislative Assembly for Balranald, serving until he was defeated in 1891. Lakeman died at Narrandera in 1910.

References

 

1849 births
1910 deaths
Members of the New South Wales Legislative Assembly
Protectionist Party politicians